Holcosus undulatus, also known commonly as the barred whiptail, the metallic ameiva, and the rainbow ameiva, is a species of lizard in the family Teiidae. The species is endemic to Mexico. There are three recognized subspecies.

Description
H. undulatus is brown-coloured, with a series of darker zig-zag bars running down the sides, often with light blue and green markings along the sides and underside. It is similar to the Middle American ameiva (H. festivus).

Habitat
H. undulatus lives in litter in open habitats.

Subspecies
The following three subspecies, including the nominotypical subspecies, are recognized as being valid.
Holcosus undulatus dexter 
Holcosus undulatus miadis 
Holcosus undulatus undulatus 

Nota bene: A trinomial authority in parentheses indicates that the subspecies was originally described in a genus other than Holcosus.

References

Further reading
Wiegmann AFA (1834). Herpetologia Mexicana, seu descriptio amphibiorum Novae Hispaniae quae itineribus comitis Sack, Ferdinandi Deppe et Chr. Guil. Schiede in Museum Zoologicum Berolinense pervenerunt. Pars prima, saurorum species amplectens. Adiecto systematis saurorum prodromo, additsque multis in hunc amphibiorum ordinem observationibus.  Berlin: C.G. Lüderitz. vi + 54 pp. + Plates I–X. (Cnemidophorus undulatus, new species, p. 26). (in Latin).

External links

Holcosus undulatus, WildHerps.net
Barred Whiptail, NaturePhoto-CZ.com

undulatus
Reptiles of North America
Reptiles described in 1834
Taxa named by Arend Friedrich August Wiegmann